Bergslagsbanans station is an historic railway station in Gothenburg, Sweden. It is designated under number 21300000027694 by the Swedish National Heritage Board.

It was designed by brothers Axel Kumlien and Hjalmar Kumlien in 1881 for the Bergslagernas Järnvägar (Bergslagen Railway, BJ). The crest of the BJ can be seen above the right entrance of the station; it symbolizes ironwork and was the trademark of the railway company.

References

Disused railway stations in Sweden
Railway stations opened in 1881
1881 establishments in Sweden
Listed buildings in Gothenburg